Jason Paul Rakers (born June 29, 1973) is an American former professional baseball player.

A native of Pittsburgh, Pennsylvania, Rakers attended the University of Pittsburgh and New Mexico State University. In 1993, he played collegiate summer baseball with the Brewster Whitecaps of the Cape Cod Baseball League. He was selected by the Indians in the 25th round of the 1995 MLB Draft.

References

External links
, or Retrosheet, or Pelota Binaria (Venezuelan Winter League)

1973 births
Living people
Águilas del Zulia players
Akron Aeros players
American expatriate baseball players in Canada
Baseball players from Pittsburgh
Brewster Whitecaps players
Buffalo Bisons (minor league) players
Cleveland Indians players
Columbus Red Stixx players
Kansas City Royals players
Kinston Indians players
Major League Baseball pitchers
Navegantes del Magallanes players
American expatriate baseball players in Venezuela
New Mexico State Aggies baseball players
Omaha Golden Spikes players
Ottawa Lynx players
Pittsburgh Panthers baseball players
River City Rascals players
Watertown Indians players